Shereen El Feki (born 1967 or 1968) is a British journalist and author, most notable for her book Sex and the Citadel: Intimate Life in a Changing Arab World.

Biography
El Feki was born in Great Britain to a Welsh mother and an Egyptian father. She grew up in Canada, visiting her grandmother in Cairo on a regular basis. She graduated from the University of Toronto with a BSc in immunology in 1991, then obtaining an MPhil and PhD in immunology from the University of Cambridge.

Career
El Feki joined The Economist as healthcare correspondent in 1998. After the 2001 WTC terror attacks, she learned Arabic and started to research the Middle East, in particular, the issues of emancipation and women's sexuality, spending much of her time in Egypt. 

In 2005, El Feki left the Economist, and from 2006 to 2008, she hosted weekly shows, People & Power and The Pulse, on Al Jazeera International. From 2010 to 2012, she was vice-chairwoman of the United Nations’ Global Commission on H.I.V. and the Law.

In 2013, El Feki published Sex and the Citadel: Intimate Life in a Changing Arab World, which has been translated into Dutch, Bahasa Indonesia, French and German, with Spanish and Arabic translations forthcoming. "Sex and the Citadel" has been nominated for the Guardian First Book Award and The Orwell Prize; El Feki's TED talk on sexuality in the Arab region has received almost 1 million views since 2014. The book surveys sexual attitudes of women and men in Egypt and the wider Arab world, and presents results of her five years of research. El Feki concludes that taboos around sexuality are starting to be challenged in the Arab societies, and that such debates in personal life are key to change in the politics, economics and the broader public sphere. However, she warns that such change comes "by evolution, not revolution" over a generation at least.

Since 2022, El Feki has been a member of the Commission for Universal Health convened by Chatham House and co-chaired by Helen Clark and Jakaya Kikwete.

References

Sources

External links
 Shereen El Feki on Twitter
 
 Global Commission on HIV and the Law
 Huffington Post interview
 
 Shereen El Feki: Pop culture in the Arab world (TEDGlobal 2009)
 Shereen El Feki: A little-told tale of sex and sensuality (TEDGlobal 2013)

British women journalists
Egyptian journalists
Egyptian non-fiction writers
Egyptian women writers
The Economist people
Living people
1960s births
Welsh people of Egyptian descent
University of Toronto alumni
Alumni of the University of Cambridge